Veergati (Martyrdom) is a 1995 Indian Hindi-language action film written, produced and directed by K.K Singh, starring Salman Khan, Atul Agnihotri, Divya Dutta and Akhilendra Mishra. This film is only film of Pooja Dadwal. Upon release the film received negative reviews mostly for its action, and was a below average at the, but had a successful DVD release.

Plot

Hawaldar finds an abandoned newborn baby boy in the gutter of Kamathipura, a red light area of Mumbai. A prostitute, meanwhile gave birth to another baby boy. She decides to educate him and requests Hawaldar to give him a father's name. Hawaldar's wife does not accept the child and leaves for her parents home. Hawaldar adopts the child and names him Ajay while the prostitute's son is named Shlok. Both are admitted to School and become friends. Shlok does well in studies whereas Ajay takes up gambling. Shlok falls in love with Pooja, daughter of J.K - a millionaire. Ajay does not believe in love and is a cynic. Havaldar tries his best to get Ajay a job, but Ajay finds it difficult to work in a corrupt society. Ekka Seth is a terror in the prostitutes' basti, he exploits the innocent girls and forces them into prostitution. Shlok graduates and completes his M.B.A. Ajay wins a crore rupees in gambling and encourages Shlok to pursue his project.  Ekka and his men abduct and kill Hawaldar's daughter, Sandhya. Ajay decides to avenge this and proceeds to kill Ekka's men and frees the sex workers from his clutches. He then takes on Ekka and manages to kill him, but is grievously wounded in the fight. The final scene shows Ajay dying in the process of burning Ekka alive and attaining martyrdom.

Cast 
 Salman Khan as Ajay
 Divya Dutta as Sandhya
 Atul Agnihotri as Shlok
 Sudesh Berry as Police Inspector Neelkanth Singh
 Pooja Dadwal as Pooja
 Akhilendra Mishra as Ikka seth
 Himani Shivpuri as Shlok's mom and Ajay's adopted mom
 Farida Jalal as Parvati
 Rohini Hattangadi as Shanta
 Saeed Jaffrey as Pooja's dad
 Kulbhushan Kharbanda as Havaldar
Sudhir Pandey as Police Commissioner
Pramod Moutho as Minister Brahmachari
Amrit Pal as Abu
Jack Gaud as Jack Gulati
Avtar Gill as Sarju

Soundtrack
The music was composed by Aadesh Shrivastava. All Lyrics were penned by Indeevar, Dev Kohli, Shyam Raj and Madan Pal.

References

External links 
 

1995 films
1990s Hindi-language films
Films scored by Aadesh Shrivastava
Films shot in Daman and Diu